Ardales is a town and municipality in the Province of Málaga, part of the autonomous community of Andalusia in southern Spain. The municipality is approximately 62.5 kilometres from Málaga.

On the hill above the town is the historic church and higher still are the ruins of the Ardales Castle. At the peak of the hill is the hermitage Ermita del Calvario. The infamous Caminito del Rey is nearby.

A paper published in 2021 disclosed that the Cave of Ardales (cueva de doña Trinidad Grund) contains pigments deposited by Middle Paleolithic Neanderthals some 64,800 years ago.

References

External links

 "Ardales, Andalusia, Spain" Motion Views photographs of Ardales

Municipalities in the Province of Málaga